Pleuroloba is a genus of small air-breathing land snails, terrestrial gastropod mollusks in the family Ellobiidae, the salt marsh snails.

Species 
Species within the genus Pleuroloba include:

 Pleuroloba costellaris (H. Adams & A. Adams, 1854)
 Pleuroloba quoyi (H. Adams & A. Adams, 1854)

References

 Hyman, I. T, Rouse, G. W. and Ponder, W. F. 2005. Systematics of Ophicardelus (Gastropoda: Heterobranchia: Ellobiidae). Molluscan Research 25(1): 14-26.

Ellobiidae